Brickellia secundiflora is a Mexican species of flowering plants in the family Asteraceae. It is native to central and northeastern Mexico from Tamaulipas west to Coahuila and south as far as Oaxaca.

Varieties
 Brickellia secundiflora var. nepetifolia (Kunth) B.L.Rob. 
 Brickellia secundiflora var. secundiflora

References

External links
photo of herbarium specimen collected in Nuevo León

secundiflora
Flora of Mexico
Plants described in 1816